Genzano di Roma is a town and comune in the Metropolitan City of Rome, in the Lazio region of central Italy.

History
The origin of the name Genzano is still disputed. According to one version, the hill overlooking the Lake of Nemi on which the city is situated was once devoted to the goddess Cynthia, whose cult was associated to that of Diana Nemorensis. Another version relates its origin to the Gentiani family. For others the presence on the hills, at that time of the "tribus or gens Cynthia" originators and custodians of the cult of courage, in "Castrum Gentianum" from them the derivation of the name Genzano.
During the Roman empire the area was inhabited by wealthy Roman citizens who wished to benefit from the cleaner air, uncontaminated water and cooler temperatures during the hot summer months. The remains of many ancient Roman villas are to be found in the surroundings. The most impressive being the walls of the "Villa of the Antonini" where the later Roman emperor Antoninus Pius (r. 138–161 AD) was born. The Herculean Sarcophagus of Genzano, currently in the British Museum was found here.

In the 12th century a tower of the Genoese Gandolfi family, lord of Castel Gandolfo, existed in the site. In 1183 Pope Lucius III gave it to the Cistercian monks of St. Anastasius of Aquae Salviae in Rome. In 1235 they built a large castle around which the town later grew. In 1378 the Popes assigned it to Giordano Orsini. The Cistercians and the Colonna alternatively ruled Genzano until 1563, when the castle was ceded for 150,000 scudos to the Massimi, from which it was bought by Giuliano Cesarini.

Livia Cesarini, the last exponent of the family and wife of Francesco II Sforza, together with architect Giovanni Iacobini, designed and built Genzano Nuova (New Genzano) in 1708, according to the most modern urban planning of that time. 
The painter Maratti was one of the citizens who settled in Livia Sforza-Cesarini's new town.

In 1873 it was decided that the name of the town should be changed to Genzano di Roma to avoid confusion within the postal service as there are two towns in Italy called Genzano.  
  
In the 19th and early 20th century it was seat of numerous peasant revolts; during World War II it suffered heavy damage under Allied bombings, which destroyed 90 percent of its buildings.

Main sights
 Baronial Palace Sforza Cesarini
 The English garden of Palace Sforza Cesarini
  Church of St. Mary of the Capuchins
 Fountain of St. Sebastian
  Cathedral of St. Mary of the Hilltop

Infiorata

In June, a folkloristic and religious exhibition, the "Infiorata" is held. A whole street (Via Italo Belardi) is covered with allegorical carpets of flowers and a masked parade walk on these, with medieval and traditional clothes realized by the town's women. The event was held for the first time in 1778. Each year the artists suggestions must conform to a previously agreed upon theme, such as "The Colours of Michelangelo", or "The Designs of Bernini". In Spring it has recently become traditional a "mini Infiorata" made by the children from the local schools.

Twin cities
 Châtillon, France
 Merseburg, Germany
 Mokotów, Poland

References

External links
 Official website of Infiorata

Castelli Romani